"Written in the Stars" is a song by English musician Elton John and American singer LeAnn Rimes. The song came from the musical Aida, written by Elton John and Tim Rice. There are two different recordings of the song, one with Rimes performing the first verse, the other with John. The song was later featured on Rimes' 2002 album I Need You and the concept album for the musical. The song was performed live at VH1 Divas Live '99.

Background
In this scene in the musical, Radames informs Aida that he's calling off the wedding. Aida knows that this would ruin her father's escape and tells him he must go through with it. Radames agrees, on condition that she escapes to freedom on a boat he will provide. The two lovers lament the complication of the circumstances of their love together before parting.

Chart performance
For John, "Written in the Stars" was his 57th top-40 single on the US Billboard charts as a performer. It would be his last US top-40 for over two decades, until he reached the region again with "Cold Heart (Pnau remix)", featuring Dua Lipa. John achieved at least one top-40 single on the US charts every year from 1970 to 1999, with this song being the last in the run. "Written in the Stars" was certified gold in the US for shipments exceeding 500,000.

In Canada, "Written in the Stars" topped the RPM Adult Contemporary chart and reached number 22 on the RPM Top Singles chart. Due to Rimes' previous country music success, it also peaked at number 74 on the RPM Country Tracks chart due to unsolicited airplay as an album cut. Elsewhere, the single reached number 10 in the United Kingdom and the top 40 in Austria, Iceland, Italy, and Switzerland.

Music video
According to an episode of VH1's Pop-Up Video, the music video for this song was meant to evoke forbidden loves, as well as the separation between the two singers. Rimes was shown in colder, more heavenly backdrops; John was given warmer backgrounds, as in a milder depiction of hell.

Track listing
CD single
 "Written in the Stars" – 4:17
 "Written in the Stars" (Alternate Version) – 4:24
 "Various Snippets" (My Strongest Suit/Not Me/A Step Too Far) – 2:27

Charts

Weekly charts

Year-end charts

Certifications

Release history

References

External links
 

1999 singles
1999 songs
Curb Records singles
Elton John songs
Island Records singles
LeAnn Rimes songs
Male–female vocal duets
Mercury Records singles
The Rocket Record Company singles
Song recordings produced by Peter Collins (record producer)
Songs from musicals
Songs with lyrics by Tim Rice
Songs with music by Elton John